The Parliamentary Under-Secretary of State for Innovation is a junior position in the Department of Health and Social Care in the British government. It is currently held by The 5th Baron Bethell,  MP, who took the office on 9 March 2020.

Responsibilities 
The minister is responsible for the following:

 COVID-19:
 supply (medicines and testing)
 treatments and vaccines
 long-term health impacts
 test and trace: testing, trace, technology
 life sciences
 medicines
 research
 health protection
 anti-microbial resistance
 global health security
 international diplomacy and relations
 data and technology
 rare diseases
 NHS security management, including cyber security
 blood and transplants and organ donation

List of ministers

References

Politics of the United Kingdom